Williams House, also known as Woodlawn and Cross House, is a historic home located near Odessa, New Castle County, Delaware.  It was built in 1859, and is -story, five bay, brick dwelling with a gable roof in the Georgian style.

It was listed on the National Register of Historic Places in 1973.

References

External links
 Woodlawn, Saint Georges Hundred, County Route 429, Odessa, New Castle County, DE: 2 data pages at Historic American Buildings Survey
 Woodlawn, House, Saint Georges Hundred, County Route 429, East of Route 428, Odessa, New Castle County, DE: 2 data pages at Historic American Buildings Survey
 Woodlawn, Crib Barn & Granary, Saint Georges Hundred, County Route 429, East of Route 428, Odessa, New Castle County, DE: 3 measured drawings and 2 data pages at Historic American Buildings Survey
 Woodlawn, Barn, Saint Georges Hundred, County Route 429, East of Route 428, Odessa, New Castle County, DE: 6 photos, 6 measured drawings, 2 data pages, and 1 photo caption page at Historic American Buildings Survey
 Woodlawn, East Cart Shed, Saint Georges Hundred, County Route 429, East of Route 428, Odessa, New Castle County, DE: 2 data pages at Historic American Buildings Survey
 Woodlawn, West Cart Shed, Saint Georges Hundred, County Route 429, East of Route 428, Odessa, New Castle County, DE: 2 data pages at Historic American Buildings Survey
 Woodlawn, Carriage Barn & Stable, Saint Georges Hundred, County Route 429, East of Route 428, Odessa, New Castle County, DE: 2 measured drawings and 2 data pages at Historic American Buildings Survey

Houses on the National Register of Historic Places in Delaware
Georgian architecture in Delaware
Houses completed in 1859
Houses in New Castle County, Delaware
National Register of Historic Places in New Castle County, Delaware